The 1957 Chatham Cup was the 30th annual nationwide knockout football competition in New Zealand.

The competition was run on a regional basis, with regional associations each holding separate qualifying rounds. Teams taking part in the final rounds are known to have included Eastern Suburbs (Auckland), Kawerau Town, Hamilton Technical Old Boys, Eastern Union (Gisborne), Moturoa, Colenso Athletic (Hawkes Bay), Wanganui Athletic, Masterton Athletic, Seatoun, Technical Old Boys (Christchurch), and Green Island.

The 1957 final
In the final a young Seatoun side were too strong for Tech. Two goals in quick succession came for the Wellington side after about 15 minutes from Stanley Goddard and William Logan. Andy McAnulty reduced the deficit before the interval, but a second Logan strike just after the break took the score out of the Christchurch side's reach.

Results

Semi-finals

Final

References

Rec.Sport.Soccer Statistics Foundation New Zealand 1957 page

Chatham Cup
Chatham Cup
Chatham Cup